Elisabeth of Brandenburg may refer to:
Elisabeth of Brandenburg, Landgravine of Thuringia (1206–1231), wife of Henry Raspe, Landgrave of Thuringia
Elisabeth of Brandenburg, Duchess of Brzeg-Legnica and Cieszyn (1403–1449), wife firstly of Louis II of Brieg and later Wenceslaus I, Duke of Cieszyn
Elisabeth of Brandenburg, Duchess of Pomerania (1425–1465), wife firstly of Joachim, Duke of Pomerania and later Wartislaw X, Duke of Pomerania
Elisabeth of Brandenburg, Duchess of Württemberg (1451–1524), wife of Eberhard II, Duke of Württemberg
Elisabeth of Brandenburg, Countess of Henneberg-Aschach (1474–1507), daughter of Albrecht III Achilles, Elector of Brandenburg and his second wife Anna of Saxony, Electress of Brandenburg; wife of Hermann VIII, Count of Henneberg-Aschach
Elisabeth of Brandenburg-Ansbach-Kulmbach (1494–1518), wife of Ernest, Margrave of Baden-Durlach
Elisabeth of Brandenburg, Duchess of Brunswick-Calenberg-Göttingen (1510–1558), wife of Eric I, Duke of Brunswick-Calenberg-Göttingen
Elisabeth of Brandenburg-Küstrin (1540–1578), wife of George Frederick, Margrave of Brandenburg-Ansbach
Margravine Elisabeth Sophie of Brandenburg (1589–1629), wife firstly of Prince Janusz Radziwiłł and later Julius Henry, Duke of Saxe-Lauenburg
Margravine Elisabeth Sophie of Brandenburg (1674–1748), wife firstly of Frederick Casimir Kettler, Duke of Courland, secondly Christian Ernst, Margrave of Brandenburg-Bayreuth and lastly Ernst Ludwig I, Duke of Saxe-Meiningen